William Thomas Paynter (6 December 1903 – 11 December 1984) was a Welsh miners' leader involved in the hunger marches of the 1930s.

Paynter was born in Cardiff, where he had a basic education before going to work at a colliery at the age of fourteen.  By the age of eighteen, he was working on the coal-face, and soon joined the Communist Party.  He was instrumental in setting up the National Unemployed Workers' Movement, and in 1937 he joined the British Battalion of the International Brigades to fight in the Spanish Civil War. In 1951 he became President of the South Wales Miners' Federation, and from 1959 to 1969 he was General Secretary of the National Union of Mineworkers.  He was also a member of Acas.

He featured in a programme in the BBC television series All Our Working Lives, which was broadcast in the year of his death and discussed the changing nature of the coal industry.

Publications
Trade Unions and the Problems of Change (1970)
My Generation (autobiography) (1972)

1903 births
1984 deaths
International Lenin School alumni
British people of the Spanish Civil War
General Secretaries of the National Union of Mineworkers (Great Britain)
Welsh miners
Welsh communists
Trade unionists from Cardiff
Communist Party of Great Britain members
International Brigades personnel